Bosham railway station serves the small village of Bosham in West Sussex, England. It is located on the West Coastway Line that runs between Brighton and Southampton,  from Brighton.

Services 
All services at Bosham are operated by Southern using  and  EMUs.

The typical off-peak service in trains per hour is:

 1 tph to 
 1 tph to 

During the peak hours, there are additional services to Brighton via Worthing, London Victoria via Horsham, Southampton Central and Portsmouth Harbour.

The typical service on Sundays is:

 1 tph to Brighton via Worthing
 1 tph to Portsmouth Harbour

References

External links 

Railway stations in West Sussex
DfT Category E stations
Former London, Brighton and South Coast Railway stations
Railway stations in Great Britain opened in 1847
Railway stations served by Govia Thameslink Railway
1847 establishments in England